Shifty (2008) is a British urban crime thriller film, written and directed by Eran Creevy. Set on the outskirts of London and filmed in Borehamwood, Shifty follows themes of friendship and loyalty over the course of 24 hours in the life of a young drug dealer, the charismatic Shifty. Shifty was filmed predominantly in Borehamwood, Hertfordshire, the home of Elstree Studios. Based on Eran Creevy's teenage experiences, and boasting convincing performances from a cast of rising stars, as well as veteran actors Jason Flemyng and Francesca Annis, the film was funded by Film London's Microwave scheme and delivered after a shooting schedule of just 18 days.

Plot
After four years, Chris returns to where he grew up, ostensibly to attend a party, but his real motive is to catch up with his old buddy Shifty, who he left behind. Whilst away, Chris has settled into responsible adult life, with a mortgage and a good job, but he is shocked to discover that Shifty has been dealing cocaine for some time, supplied by the double-dealing Glen.

Although happy to see him, Shifty has not fully forgiven Chris for leaving in the first place, and it soon transpires that the circumstances of Chris's departure are more complicated than they first seemed. They spend the next 24 hours together,  Chris watching Shifty as he deals to a variety of increasingly desperate customers from the community.

Over the course of this day they are forced to confront the ghosts from the past that drove Chris away and led to the desperate and dangerous present that Shifty finds himself in, whilst re-discovering their friendship. Chris is once again given an opportunity to prove his loyalty to Shifty and ultimately to try to save Shifty from himself.

Cast
 Riz Ahmed as Shifty — a local drug dealer who gets torn between street crime and what could be different
 Daniel Mays as Chris — an old friend of Shifty's who spends a day with him, but is forced to face up to why he left his hometown
 Jason Flemyng as Glen — the middle man for the drug dealers, he also supplies for Shifty
 Nitin Ganatra as Rez — Shifty's brother, who takes Shifty in when his family kick him out, has issues with Shifty's chosen lifestyle
 Heronimo Sehmi as Ronnie – Shifty's father, who kicks him out because he does not agree with his lifestyle choices
 Francesca Annis as Valerie
 Jay Simpson as Trevor
 Dannielle Brent as Jasmine
 Kate Groombridge as Loretta
 Alice Cutter as Tasha
 Ben Drew as Drug Dealer (Uncredited)

Soundtrack

The soundtrack to the film was composed by Molly Nyman, Harry Escott and performed by The Samphire Band. It was nominated for Best Technical Achievement at the British Independent Film Awards 2008. The score was performed live in Film & Music Arena at the Latitude Festival in 2009. All tracks performed by The Samphire Band, except where stated.

Track listing
 "Shifty Theme"
 "Busting My Ghaand"
 "Charming Glen"
 "Why Am I Running?"
 "CataclysMic" (performed by DJ Trax & Rich Beggar)
 "Swings"
 "Spilling the Various"
 "Blare's House"
 "Tough Call"
 "Good Boy"
 "Look At You"
 "Night Watch"
 "Leave it All Behind"
 "Play the Tape"
 "Shifty" (performed by Riz MC, Sway & Plan B)

"Shifty" – single

The official single for the film was performed by British rappers Riz MC aka Riz Ahmed who also portrays the eponymous character in the film, Sway and Plan B. Released on 11 May 2009 on True Tiger Recordings, the single did not chart. The music video, also directed by Eran Creevy, was filmed in the same locations as the film and features Riz MC, Sway and Plan B each rapping along with footage taken from the film. Riz MC, Sway and Plan B performed the song live on 24 April 2009 at Bar Rumba, London for the film's launch party.

 Digital download and CD single
 "Shifty" – 3:36
 "Shifty" (Sukh Knight Remix) – 4:53

 12" vinyl
 "Shifty" (Sukh Knight Remix) – 4:53
 "Shifty" (Scandalous United Remix) – 6:26
 "Shifty" – 3:36

Reception
The film has a 96% rating on Rotten Tomatoes out of 25 reviews. Many claimed that despite a very low budget, the film's actors and storyline was of the highest calibre, and therefore was a well formed, character-driven debut for Creevy. However, customers on Amazon.co.uk only gave an average review of 3.5 stars, with some claiming that the film's low budget left it with a dialogue-driven production with little or no action to add to proceedings.

Award nominations
The film was nominated for British Independent Film Awards in the following categories:
Best Achievement in Production
Best Actor (Riz Ahmed)
Best Supporting Actor (Daniel Mays)
Best Technical Achievement (Harry Escott, Molly Nyman)
Douglas Hickox Award (Eran Creevy)
Bronze Horse (Eran Creevy)

References

External links
 
 
 
 
 Interview with Daniel Mays and Eran Creevy

2008 films
2008 crime thriller films
2000s English-language films
Black British films
British crime thriller films
Films about drugs
Films directed by Eran Creevy
Films set in London
Films shot at Elstree Film Studios
Films shot in Hertfordshire
2000s British films